Hydrocena is a genus of gastropods belonging to the family Hydrocenidae.

The genus has almost cosmopolitan distribution.

Species:

Hydrocena atavina 
Hydrocena bridgesi 
Hydrocena cattaroensis 
Hydrocena cerea 
Hydrocena cornea 
Hydrocena diaphana 
Hydrocena dubiosa 
Hydrocena dubrueiliana 
Hydrocena exserta 
Hydrocena gutta 
Hydrocena japonica 
Hydrocena kenyana 
Hydrocena lirata 
Hydrocena moncuccoensis 
Hydrocena navigatorum 
Hydrocena noticola 
Hydrocena obtusa 
Hydrocena praecursor 
Hydrocena puisseguri 
Hydrocena pyramis 
Hydrocena rara 
Hydrocena solidula 
Hydrocena spiralis 
Hydrocena tanzaniensis 
Hydrocena trolli 
Hydrocena turbinata

References

Hydrocenidae